Major Julian Ito Piggott MC (25 March 1888 – 23 January 1965) was an English first-class cricketer active 1910–13 who played for Surrey and soldier. He was born in Tokyo; died in Dorking.  He was an MC in the 1917 Birthday Honours for his service during World War I

References

1888 births
1965 deaths
English cricketers
Surrey cricketers
British Army personnel of World War I
Commanders Crosses of the Order of Merit of the Federal Republic of Germany
Recipients of the Military Cross